The women's long jump (T38) at the 2018 Commonwealth Games, as part of the athletics programme, took place in the Carrara Stadium on 8 April 2018. The event was open to para-sport athletes competing under the T37 / T38 classifications.

Records
Prior to this competition, the existing world and Games records were as follows:

Schedule
The schedule was as follows:

All times are Australian Eastern Standard Time (UTC+10)

Results
With seven entrants, the event was held as a straight final.

Final

References

Women's long jump (T38)
2018
2018 in women's athletics